Simeon Vratanja ( ca. 1600–d. 1630) was the first bishop of the Eparchy of Vretanija (1609–11), the westernmost eparchy of the Serbian Patriarchate of Peć, and the first bishop of the Eastern Catholic Bishopric of Marča (1611–28).

Establishment of Vretanija as an eparchy of the Patriarchate of Peć 
There are different views on the year of establishment of Vretanija as an eparchy of the Patriarchate of Peć; according to Johann von Csaplovics (1780–1847), it was established in 1578 and its first bishop was Metropolitan Gavrilo to whom Simeon was subordinated as archimandrite in Marča. There is an account that in ca. 1600 Simeon (episcopus nationis Serbicae) and other Orthodox clergy, with many of their people, Serbs, also called "Rascians", fled into Austrian territories, and resided in the Marča Monastery. On Vidovdan (28 June) 1609, Simeon was appointed the bishop of Orthodox Serbs in the Habsburg monarchy by Serbian Patriarch Jovan. Simeon had jurisdiction over the Serbs that settled in what is today Croatia. According to Aleksa Ivić, this appointment marked the establishment of the Eparchy of Vratanija.

Eastern Catholicism 
Being under strong pressure from Croatian Catholic clergy and state officials to recognize Papal jurisdiction, and to convert the population of his bishopric to Eastern Catholicism (Uniate), Simeon visited the Pope in 1611 and recognized his jurisdiction and maybe the Union of Florence as well. He confessed Catholicism in front of Robert Bellarmine. The strongest influence to his decision was Martin Dobrović who convinced him to recognize Papal jurisdiction and to accept Eastern Catholicism. In November 1611 the Pope appointed Simeon as bishop of Slavonia, Croatia and Hungary, while in reality his jurisdiction was limited to Orthodox population of Slavonia and Croatia. The Pope granted all former estates of the Catholic Monastery of All Saints to the Marča Monastery. On 21 November 1611 Marča was established as bishopric of the Eastern Catholic Church. It is estimated that in 1611 it had around 60,000 members. Simeon continued to use the Slavic language, Eastern Orthodox church rites, the Julian calendar, and did not severe ties with the Patriarchate of Peć, nor did he become a vicar of the Catholic bishop of Zagreb. Only part of the Marča brotherhood and local Orthodox Serbs followed him in the Uniatism. When the Serbian patriarch received news that Simeon had accepted union with the Catholic church he deposed Simeon from his position in 1628. Simeon died in 1630.

Titles
He was named bishop (vladika) of the Western Provinces by Serbian Patriarch Jovan in 1609.
He signed himself "Rascian (Serb) bishop". Mentioned as such on 15 January 1615.
Pope Paul V recognized Simeon Vratanja as a "true Episcope of Rascians of Greek rite" within the borders of Hungary, Slavonia, Croatia and Carniola, while the Emperor Leopold I had already give him the title of "svidički" Episcope and the authority over the settlers of eastern rite in Croatia.

Annotations
He signed himself . His byname, derived from the name of his eparchy, is rendered "Vretanja" (Симеон Вретања), and scarcer as "Vratanja" (Симеон Вратања) in Serbian.

References

Sources 

 
  
 
 
 
 
 
 
 
 
 
 
 

1630 deaths
17th-century Eastern Catholic bishops
Converts to Eastern Catholicism from Eastern Orthodoxy
Former Serbian Orthodox Christians
Serbian Eastern Catholics
17th-century Serbian people
17th-century Croatian people
Bishops of the Serbian Orthodox Church
Year of birth uncertain
17th-century Eastern Orthodox bishops
History of the Serbs of Croatia